The Consulate General of China in Manchester, England, is a diplomatic mission of China in the United Kingdom.

History 
The consulate occupies a Grade II listed building, called Denison House, built in 1862.

Protest 

On October 16, 2022, the day of the commencement of the 20th National Congress of the Chinese Communist Party, a clash occurred outside the consulate general between UK-based Hong Kong pro-democracy activists and consulate members. Then Consul General is Zheng Xiyuan was involved as well.

See also 
 Embassy of China, London
 Listed buildings in Manchester-M14

References 

Diplomatic missions of China
Grade II listed buildings in Greater Manchester